A 77-minute original cast recording of Harry Connick Jr.'s Tony nominated score from the 2001 Broadway musical Thou Shalt Not.
Music and lyrics by Connick who does not sing on this album, but plays the piano as an "additional musician", and does the orchestrations and arrangements, and is a producer on the album.

Released 18 June 2002, from Papa's-June Music, on Amazon.com
Producers: Tracey Freeman, Harry Connick Jr.
Length:   1:17:24

Track listing 
ACT ONE: "Overture" – 2:16
"It's Good To Be Home" – 5:17 – J.C. Montgomery, Ted L. Levy & Ensemble
"I Need To Be in Love Ballet" – 3:04 – Kate Levering
"My Little World" – 3:26 – Debra Monk
"While You're Young" – 1:40 – Craig Bierko
"I Need To Be in Love" – 3:00 – Kate Levering
"Broken Tea Cup" – 1:32
"The Other Hours" – 3:49 – Craig Bierko
"The Other Hours Ballet" – 3:10 – Craig Bierko, Kate Levering
"All Things" – 2:30 – Norbert Leo Butz
"Sovereign Lover" – 5:07 – Kate Levering, Craig Bierko & Ensemble
"I've Got My Eye on You" – 3:14 – Debra Monk, Norbert Leo Butz
"Light the Way" – 2:41 – Ensemble
"Take Her to the Mardi Gras" – 5:12 – Craig Bierko, Norbert Leo Butz, Kate Levering & Ensemble
"Tug Boat" – 4:15 – Norbert Leo Butz, Kate Levering
ACT TWO: "Entr'Acte" – 1:06
"Won't You Sanctify" – 3:06 – Ted L. Levy & Ensemble
"Time Passing" – 2:26 – Kate Levering, Craig Bierko, Debra Monk & Ensemble
"Take Advantage" – 3:50 – Leo Burmester
"Oh! Ain't That Sweet" – 3:35 – Norbert Leo Butz
"Thou Shalt Not Ballet" – 8:33 – Kate Levering, Craig Bierko & Ensemble
"I Like Love More" – 2:49
"It's Good To Be Home (reprise)" – 1:46 – Norbert Leo Butz

Various information
Sony releases the two-disc album Harry on Broadway, Act I in 2006: 1. disc, Original Broadway cast recording The Pajama Game; 2. disc, Songs from Thou Shalt Not, Harry Connick Jr featuring Kelli O'Hara
Versions of "I Like Love More", "All Things" and "Good To Be Home" are part of the 2005 instrumental album Occasion : Connick on Piano, Volume 2, with Harry Connick Jr on piano and Branford Marsalis on saxophone.
A recording of "Other Hours" with Harry Connick Jr on vocal, is on his 2004 Grammy nominated album Only You.
Connick's 2003 instrumental album Other Hours : Connick on Piano, Volume 1, consists of 12 compositions written for Thou Shalt Not, including some not used in the final version of the play.

References

External links
Audio samples of these songs can be heard as a request at BroadwayWorld Radio

Harry Connick Jr. albums
Cast recordings
Theatre soundtracks
2002 soundtrack albums